Daniel John Bedingfield (born 3 December 1979) is a New Zealand-British singer, songwriter, record producer and actor. He is the eldest brother of fellow singers Natasha Bedingfield and Nikola Rachelle. He was a judge on The X Factor New Zealand in 2013.

Early life

Bedingfield spent much of his early life in Auckland, New Zealand, and attended Lynfield College.

Music career

2001–2003: Gotta Get Thru This and international breakthrough
He released his first single, "Gotta Get Thru This" in November 2001. It gathered momentum on white label through the UK garage music scene, and peaked at number one on the UK Singles Chart. He has since had two more number-one singles on the chart, "If You're Not The One" and "Never Gonna Leave Your Side", as well as three further top ten hits. His debut album, also titled Gotta Get Thru This, which was recorded at home using Making Waves Audio software and Reason, peaked at number two on the UK Albums Chart and went on to sell more than 4 million copies worldwide.

2004–2011: Second First Impression and other projects
In 2004, Bedingfield won a BRIT Award for Best British Male Artist. He then moved to the Universal Music subsidiary label Polydor Records to release his second album, Second First Impression, which reached number 8 in the UK. The album sold poorly compared to his first offering, though it did include two UK Top 20 singles, "Nothing Hurts Like Love" (which reached number three) and "Wrap My Words Around You" (which peaked at number 12). The third and final single, "The Way", became his first to miss the top 40, reaching number 41. The album was also released in Singapore (featuring 'If You're Not The One' as a bonus track).

In an interview with the New Zealand Herald in April 2007, Bedingfield said that, after a four-year hiatus, he had three albums recorded and awaiting release.

Since his last release in 2004, Bedingfield continued to work with other artists. He co-wrote the song "Works for Me!" for American Idol finalist David Archuleta. He has also worked with Pixie Lott, and contributed guest vocals on a track by a former member of The Roots. In December 2009, he co-wrote material with Tessanne Chin as well as recorded three songs with Busy Signal at DJ Karim's Stainless Records studios in Kingston, Jamaica. Bedingfield provided backing vocals for the Kirsten Morrell track "He Walked In" from the album Ultraviolet, which was released in May 2010. In December 2010, Bedingfield spent a month in Tel Aviv, Israel, where he wrote and recorded a song with a local freak folk band, The Raw Men Empire. He concluded his visit with a Tel Aviv gig, hosting Uzi Feinerman, The Raw Men Empire and a variety of other Israeli musicians. In July 2011, he recorded on a dancehall riddim called the Overproof Riddim. Like many of the songs on this riddim, it has been getting good rotation in Jamaica.

2012–present: Stop the Traffik, The X Factor and acting
In February 2012, Bedingfield released the single "Rocks Off" with an accompanying video on MTV which can be viewed here. "Rocks Off" was released alongside B-side "It's Not Me, It's You". On 24 April, Bedingfield released the EP Stop the Traffik – Secret Fear, his first EP release since becoming independent. The EP featured both the previously released "Rocks Off" and "It's Not Me, Its You" as well as five other new tracks. The EP was followed by the release of "Secret Fear" as a single, the video features adult scenes and has gone on to win several awards.
On 21 December 2012, Bedingfield took up a role as a judge for the first New Zealand series of The X Factor joining Stan Walker, Melanie Blatt and Ruby Frost. The series premiered on TV3 on 21 April 2013. Bedingfield mentored the Girls category. His sister Natasha appeared as an assistant during the Judges Retreats round. Bedingfield was the winning mentor of series one when his act Jackie Thomas won the competition.

Bedingfield co-wrote "I Wanna Feel" by SecondCity, which debuted at number one on the UK Singles Chart on 1 June 2014 and stayed in the top 20 for the next six weeks. The song was Bedingfield's fourth number one in the UK. He spent time working in the studio with K-pop group Spica, including co-producing their first English language single "I Did It". He was also the group's vocal director. In 2015, he co-wrote the song "Testify" which was included on The X Factor UK 2014 winner Ben Haenow's self-titled debut studio album.

From February 2016, Bedingfield appeared in the West End musical The War of the Worlds as The Artilleryman. Bedingfield left the show in April 2016.

Personal life
While on holiday visiting his parents in New Zealand in 2004, Bedingfield nearly died in a serious car accident, which left him with severe head and neck injuries because of the car rolling on him.

His mother, Molly Bedingfield, is founder and CEO of Global Angels, for which Daniel is doing fundraising work. Bedingfield also helped to launch the Stop the Traffik coalition against modern day slavery.

Discography

 Gotta Get Thru This (2002)
 Second First Impression (2004)

Awards and nominations
{| class=wikitable
|-
! Year !! Awards !! Category !! Work !! Result
|-
|rowspan=5|2002
| rowspan=3|MOBO Awards
| UK Act of the Year
| rowspan=4|Daniel Bedingfield
| 
|-
| Best Newcomer
| 
|-
| Best Garage Act 
| 
|-
| Pop Factory Awards
| Best Pop Factory Debut
| 
|-
| BRIT Awards
| Best British Single
|rowspan=5|"Gotta Get Thru This"
| 
|-
| rowspan=9|2003
| Grammy Awards
| Best Dance Recording
| 
|-
| BMI Pop Awards
| Award-Winning Song 
| 
|-
| DanceStar USA Awards
| Record of the Year
| 
|-
| rowspan=2|International Dance Music Awards
| Best Pop Dance Track
| 
|-
| Best New Dance Artist Solo 
| Daniel Bedingfield
| 
|-
| Popjustice £20 Music Prize
| Best British Pop Single
| rowspan=3|"If You're Not the One"
| 
|-
| The Record of the Year
| Record of the Year
| 
|-
| rowspan=2|Billboard Music Awards
| Top Hot Dance Maxi-Single Sales
| 
|-
| Top Hot Dance Maxi-Singles Sales Artist
| Daniel Bedingfield
| 
|-
| rowspan=6|2004
| rowspan=2|Groovevolt Music and Fashion Awards
| Best Album - Male
| Gotta Get Thru This
| 
|-
| Best Song Performance - Male
| "If You're Not the One"
| 
|- 
| rowspan=3|BRIT Awards
| Best British Male
| rowspan=2|Daniel Bedingfield
| 
|-
| Best Pop Act
| 
|-
| Best British Album
| Gotta Get Thru This
| 
|-
| ASCAP Pop Music Awards
| Most Performed Song
| "If You're Not the One"
| 
|-
| 2009
| International Dance Music Awards
| rowspan=2|Best Music Video
| "The One" (ft. Sharam)
| 
|-
| 2012
| Miami Short Film Festival
| rowspan=2=|"Secret Fear"
| 
|-
| rowspan=2|2013
| Amsterdam Film Festival
| Van Gogh Prize, Special Jury Award
| 
|-
| SXSW Film Festival
| Best of the Fest 
| Daniel Bedingfield
|

See also
List of number-one dance hits (United States)
List of artists who reached number one on the U.S. dance chart

References

External links
 Part of Who the Hell is... Daniel Bedingfield
 Homepage of the Vocal Group SONO www.vocalgroupsono.com

1979 births
Living people
Brit Award winners
English people of New Zealand descent
British performers of Christian music
English dance musicians
English electronic musicians
English record producers
English tenors
English Christians
English pop singers
English male singer-songwriters
New Zealand emigrants to the United Kingdom
People from Lewisham
Island Records artists
Polydor Records artists
Relentless Records artists
21st-century English singers
21st-century British male singers
UK garage singers
People educated at Lynfield College